Melicope sororia is a species of plant in the family Rutaceae. It is endemic to Borneo where it is confined to Sabah.

References

sororia
Endemic flora of Borneo
Flora of Sabah
Taxonomy articles created by Polbot